The 1994 Swedish Open was a men's tennis tournament played on outdoor clay courts in Båstad, Sweden that was part of the World Series of the 1994 ATP Tour. It was the 47th edition of the tournament and was held from 4 July until 11 July 1994. Unseeded Bernd Karbacher won the singles title.

Finals

Singles
 Bernd Karbacher defeated  Horst Skoff, 6–4, 6–3
 It was Karbacher's 1st singles title of the year and the 2nd of his career.

Doubles
 Jan Apell /  Jonas Björkman defeated  Nicklas Kulti /  Mikael Tillström, 6–2, 6–3

References

External links
 ITF tournament edition details

Swedish Open
Swedish Open
Swedish Open
Swedish Open
Swed